Suresh Chandra Tiwari (Hindi: सुरेश चंद्र तिवारी; born 3 November 1956) is an Indian politician and former MLA from Lucknow Cantonment constituency. He is formerpresident of the Bharatiya Janata Party (BJP) (Awadh Region).

Career 
Tiwari has been elected from BJP in 1996, 2002 and 2007. He was defeated in 2012 by Rita Bahuguna Joshi and then won again in 2019.

References

Living people
Bharatiya Janata Party politicians from Uttar Pradesh
Date of birth missing (living people)
Place of birth missing (living people)
Uttar Pradesh MLAs 1997–2002
Uttar Pradesh MLAs 2002–2007
Uttar Pradesh MLAs 2007–2012
1956 births